Luis Héctor Villalba (born 11 October 1934) is an Argentine prelate of the Roman Catholic Church. He is the Archbishop Emeritus of Tucumán, where he was previously Archbishop from 1999 to 2011.

Education

Completed his primary and secondary education in Buenos Aires. He entered the Metropolitan Seminary of Buenos Aires (Villa Devoto) in 1952 after earning the title of mercantile peritus in state schools. In 1961, he obtained licentiates in theology and ecclesiastical history at the Pontifical Gregorian University, Rome.

Episcopate

He was ordained a priest on 24 September 1960.

In 1961 he obtained a licentiate in theology and Church history from the Pontifical Gregorian University.

In 1967 he was appointed as prefect of the major seminary and professor in the Faculty of Theology at the Catholic University of Buenos Aires. In 1968 he became the first director of the San José vocational institute, where candidates to the priesthood of the archdiocese prepared for courses in philosophy and theology. From 1969 to 1971 he served as dean of the faculty of theology, and in 1972 he was appointed as parish priest of Santa Rosa da Lima in Buenos Aires.

On 20 October 1984 he was assigned the titular see of Ofena and appointed as auxiliary of Buenos Aires.

On 16 July 1991 he was transferred to the diocese of San Martin.

He served as metropolitan archbishop of Tucumán from 8 July 1999 to 10 June 2011. He was the first deputy president of the Episcopal Conference of Argentina for two consecutive mandates (2005–2008 and 2008–2011), under the presidency of the then-archbishop of Buenos Aires, Cardinal Jorge Mario Bergoglio. Previously he had been president of the Episcopal Commission for Catechesis and a member of the Commission for the Lay Apostolate.

Cardinal

On 4 January 2015, Pope Francis announced that he would make him a cardinal on 14 February. At that ceremony, he was assigned the titular church of San Girolamo a Corviale.
On September 4, 2021, Villalba in his role as papal representative presided over the Rite of Beatification of the friar Fray Mamerto Esquiú

See also
Cardinals created by Pope Francis

References

External links
 

1934 births
Living people
People from Buenos Aires
Argentine cardinals
Cardinals created by Pope Francis
21st-century Roman Catholic archbishops in Argentina
Roman Catholic bishops of San Martín in Argentina
Roman Catholic bishops of Buenos Aires